Odd Sørli (born 29 November 1954) is a retired Danish-born Norwegian alpine skier. He competed for Norway at the 1976, 1980 and 1984 Winter Olympics with the best result of 19th place in the giant slalom in 1984.

After retiring from competitions Sørli worked as a journalist for Se og Hør, and in 1996 co-founded the company Off Piste, which organizes parties and adventure trips.

References

External links

1954 births
Living people
Norwegian male alpine skiers
Olympic alpine skiers of Norway
Alpine skiers at the 1976 Winter Olympics
Alpine skiers at the 1980 Winter Olympics
Alpine skiers at the 1984 Winter Olympics
Sportspeople from Copenhagen